Indiadactylus is a genus of beetles in the family Buprestidae, containing the following species:

 Indiadactylus chinensis (Obenberger, 1924)
 Indiadactylus indicus (Obenberger, 1924)
 Indiadactylus nigricans (Kerremans, 1890)
 Indiadactylus pulchellus (Gory & Laporte, 1839)

References

Buprestidae genera